Princes Group is an international food and drink group involved in the manufacture, import and distribution of branded and customer own-brand products.
Customers include major supermarkets, convenience stores, foodservice operators, wholesale suppliers and other food manufacturers. Princes’ brands and products span over 20 different categories including fish, meat, fruit, vegetables, soups, pastes, pasta, cooking sauces, edible oils and a broad range of soft drinks sectors.

History 
Princes’ heritage dates back to 1880, when it was established as a fish importing business in Liverpool, the city where its international headquarters are still located today.
Initially, the company expanded into new markets including the import of canned and ambient foods from around the world.
Princes’ first venture into food manufacturing happened in 1946, starting a period of diversification and growth which continues today. Princes first entered continental Europe in 1960 and today its European operations are managed from its offices in Rotterdam in the Netherlands. As a wholly owned subsidiary of Mitsubishi Corporation since 1989, Princes has completed a number of high-profile mergers and acquisitions in the last two decades that have added significant scale to the business.  In February 2018, Princes announced it was conducting a business review after net profits fell from £43.5m to £0.5m in the space of one year.  In October 2018, it was announced factories in Manchester and Chichester were closing.

Timeline 
 1880 Founded in Liverpool by Simpson & Roberts
 1900 Princes Pure Foods formed, Princes brand established
 1946 Princes starts first manufacturing venture
 1960 Princes enters continental Europe
 1968 Purchased by J. Bibby and Sons
 1989 Mitsubishi Corporation buys Princes
 1991 Princes enters the soft drinks category through the acquisition of Barraclough
 1999 Princes acquires Tuna Mauritius
 2001 Princes acquires both the Shippam’s and Napolina brands/businesses
 2004 Princes acquires water business and the Aqua Pura brand
 2005 Princes acquires cooking oils brands and forms Edible Oils Limited (EOL) joint venture business. Princes establishes MC Foods Europe
 2010 Princes opens Princes Polska office and forms joint venture business to expand distribution of oils in eastern and central Europe
 2011 Princes acquires two East Anglian canning operations and the Crosse & Blackwell and Farrow’s brands
 2012 Princes Industrie Alimentari S.r.L. (PIA) created and processing factory in Foggia Italy acquired
 2015 Princes Tuna (Mauritius) completes agreement to create enlarged tuna processing operation
 2018 Princes announce business review after net profits fall to £0.5m  In October 2018 they announced factories in Manchester and Chichester are to close, with a further review of operations still going

Owned and operated brands 
Brands

Some of the well-known brands (*= Licensed brands) Princes manufacture and produce are:
 Aqua Pura - natural mineral water brand sourced from Cumbria
 Batchelors* – a brand that dates back to 1895 with a range that includes canned soups and peas (Under License from Premier Foods.)
 Branston* – a brand well known for its store cupboard favourites such as baked beans, spaghetti bolognese, macaroni cheese and ravioli (Under License from Mizkan.)
 Cookeen – traditional baking fat used in pastry and made from 100% vegetable oil
 Crisp 'n Dry – popular UK vegetable oil brand
 Crosse & Blackwell - canned food brand that includes favourites such as baked beans, soups, pasta, vegetables and ready meals
 Farrow’s – British-grown giant marrowfat processed peas
 Flora* – popular sunflower oil brand
 Jucee – popular squash drinks brand
 Mazola - corn and speciality oil brand. Range includes corn, peanut, grapeseed, rapeseed and sunflower oils
 Napolina - Italian-style ingredients brand. Range includes sun-ripened tomatoes to fruity olive oils, pasta and pasta sauces, as well as more specialist grated cheese, pulses and pizza products 
 Olivio* - cooking oil first launched in 1991, made with a blend of vegetable and olive oils
 Princes – a brand in itself, the Princes range now includes a diverse selection of over 350 food and drink products including canned fish, meat, fruit and vegetables, microwavable ready meals, sandwich fillings and soft drinks
 Pura Organic Oil* – organic sunflower oil and rapeseed oil brand first launched in 2010
 Shippam’s – traditional English brand whose range includes spreads and canned ready meals
 Trex – home baking brand which is a dairy-free alternative to butter
 Vier Diamanten – popular Austrian canned fish brand
 Wielkopolski – cooking oil used for frying, baking, salad dressings, and in cakes and desserts

Sites
Princes operates 15 production sites across the globe.  These are:

UK food sites:
 Chichester – on the south coast of England, this site produces a variety of pack formats from cans and jars to pouches and microwavable pots
 Long Sutton – located in rural Lincolnshire, this site produces a range of canned products including baked beans, vegetables, fruit, pulses, pies, pasta, meatballs and ready meals
 Wisbech – located in Cambridgeshire, this site produces canned and pouch products including baked beans, soups, pulses, pasta, vegetables and sauces

UK soft drinks sites:
 Eden Valley – set in the Cumbrian countryside, this site draws natural mineral water from what is believed to be one of Europe’s largest aquifers. The site’s water sources are protected, as it is set in an EU Special Area of Conservation
 Cardiff – produces juice products in cartons
 Manchester – produces fruit juices in bottle and carton formats
 Bradford – this site produces squash and carbonated soft drinks
 Glasgow – supplies canned soft drinks

Edible oils:
 Belvedere  – located in the South East, this site produces olive and speciality oils
 Erith – located in London, this site produces cooking oil
 Szamotuły – Located in the north west region of Wielkopolska in Poland, the site primarily produced rapeseed oil.

International:
 Riche Terre, Port Louis, Mauritius – one of the most technologically advanced tuna processing facilities in the world
 Foggia, Italy – this factory is one of the most modern and efficient ambient tomato processing facilities in Europe
 Marine Road, Port Louis, Mauritius - a major processing facility producing tuna loins

References

External links
 Official website

Food and drink companies of the United Kingdom
Companies established in 1880
Companies based in Liverpool
1880 establishments in England
Mitsubishi companies
Food and drink companies established in 1880